Chuqi Nasa (Aymara chuqi gold, nasa nose, "gold nose", Hispanicized spellings Choque Nasa, Choquenasa) is a mountain in the Andes of Bolivia, about  high. It is located in the Oruro Department, Poopó Province, Poopó Municipality.

References 

Mountains of Oruro Department